The First Christian Church  in Murray, Kentucky is a historic Christian Church (Disciples of Christ) church at 111 N. Fifth Street. It was built in 1904 and added to the National Register of Historic Places in 1986.

It was designed by Paducah architect A. L. Lassiter;  construction was supervised by George Aycock.  It has a central gable and two corner towers and is a striking landmark in Murray.

See also
National Register of Historic Places listings in Kentucky

References

External links

Churches on the National Register of Historic Places in Kentucky
Gothic Revival church buildings in Kentucky
Churches completed in 1904
20th-century churches in the United States
National Register of Historic Places in Calloway County, Kentucky
1904 establishments in Kentucky
Murray, Kentucky
Disciples of Christ churches in Kentucky